Geoffrey Hale (born 25 March 1938) is an Australian rower. He competed in the men's eight event at the 1960 Summer Olympics.

References

1938 births
Living people
Australian male rowers
Olympic rowers of Australia
Rowers at the 1960 Summer Olympics
Rowers from Western Australia